Tikehau Airport is an airport on Tikehau atoll in French Polynesia . The airport is located 1 km southeast of Tuherahera. It was inaugurated in 1977. In 2009, 41,817 passengers transited through Tikehau.

The airport has minimal services: there is no runway lighting system for landing at night, no instrument approach and no control tower.

Airlines and destinations

Passenger

Statistics

References

External links

Airports in French Polynesia
Airports established in 1977
1977 establishments in French Polynesia